The 1991–92 North Carolina Tar Heels men's basketball team represented the University of North Carolina from Chapel Hill, North Carolina.

Led by head coach Dean Smith, the Tar Heels reached the Sweet 16 in the NCAA tournament.

Roster

Schedule and results

|-
!colspan=9 | Regular Season
|-

|-
!colspan=9 | ACC Tournament
|-

|-
!colspan=9 | NCAA Tournament
|-

Rankings

References

North Carolina Tar Heels men's basketball seasons
Tar
Tar
North Carolina
North Carolina